Šumarski list is one of the oldest, still-publishing forestry journals in the world. It was established in October 1876 and is published by the Croatian Forestry Society.

See also 
 List of forestry journals

References

Publications established in 1876
Forestry journals
Croatian-language journals
Monthly journals
Forestry in Croatia
Academic journals published by learned and professional societies
Academic journals of Croatia
1876 establishments in Austria-Hungary